Alejandro Echaniz Partida (born 7 September 1942) is a Mexican wrestler. He competed in two events at the 1964 Summer Olympics.

References

External links
 

1942 births
Living people
Mexican male sport wrestlers
Olympic wrestlers of Mexico
Wrestlers at the 1964 Summer Olympics
Place of birth missing (living people)